Alan Davies (born August 26, 1951), is a contemporary American poet, critic, and editor who has been writing and publishing since the 1970s. Today, he is most often associated with the Language poets.

Life and work
Alan Davies was born in Lacombe, a town in central Alberta, Canada. By the mid-1970s, he was editing a poetry journal, Occulist Witnesses, in the  Boston area where he had stayed for a few years after attending Robert Creeley's poetry class at Harvard Summer School in 1972. By this time he had hand-published John Wieners' treatise on and for young poets, "The Lanterns along the Wall," which Wieners had written especially for Creeley's class. and began more actively publishing his own poetry. Soon, Davies was forming relations with an experimental group of writers whose practice became determining features of what grew into the Language School. This 'school' was not a group precisely, but a tendency in the work of many of its so-called practitioners.

Davies edited A Hundred Posters, one of the important "little" magazines of the "Language" movement. Subsequently, Davies was included in the crucial anthology devoted to "language-centred" writing: In the American Tree, edited by Ron Silliman (National Poetry Foundation, 1986; 2002).

Alan Davies, who is a Buddhist (as pointed out by Juliana Spahr), is currently living and working in New York City.

Davies was the 2011 writer in residence at the University of Windsor.

Bibliography

Poetry 
Collections
 
 A AN AV ES. (Needham, MA: Potes & Poets Press, 1981)
Mnemonotechnics. (Hartford, CT: Potes & Poets Press, 1982)
ACTIVE 24 HOURS. (New York: Roof Books/Segue Foundation, 1982) 
NAME. (Berkeley, CA : This Press, 1986)
RAVE. (New York: Roof Books/Segue Foundation, 1994) : poetry
"untitled", Alan Davies, M.M. Winterford. (Gran Canaria : Zasterle Press, 1994) 
Sei Shonagon (Hole, 1995)
Book 5  (Cambridge, MA: Katalanché Press, 2006)
RAW WAR (Annandale on Hudson, NY: Subpress, 2012) 
ODES & fragments (New York City: Ellipsis Press, 2013)

Literary criticism 
Pursue Veritable Simples, (Annex Press 1983)
Signage. (New York: Roof Books, 1987) 
Candor. (Oakland, CA : O Books, 1990)

Critical studies and reviews of Davies' work

Don't Know Alan: Notes on AD, with Miles Champion. (Philadelphia: Slought Books, 2002): essay in e-book format, link here Slought Foundation
Candor

Notes

External links
"Extensions : Louis Cabri on Hole Magazine" Cabri's on-line essay becomes both a response to, and an engagement with, the work & poetics of Alan Davies
What Goes Around Davies' essay/review & reflections on Brenda Iijima's book Around Sea
Alan Davies Author Page at EPC
7 Poems poems by Davies appearing in the on-line zine: oneedit, issue no. 10  (2008)
To Call Them by Their Dead Name Davies reflects upon the life and work of Emanuel Carnevali
Interview with Alan Davies first appeared on-line, September 25, 2007, conducted by Tom Beckett at E-X-C-H-A-N-G-E-V-A-L-U-E-S,a blog devoted to interviews with contemporary poets
The Dea(r)th of Poetry essay/manifesto/critique published online in February 2010

American male poets
Language poets
Living people
1951 births
American magazine founders
Canadian expatriate writers in the United States
Canadian emigrants to the United States
Harvard Summer School alumni